Carency is a commune in the Pas-de-Calais department in the Hauts-de-France region of France.

Geography
A farming village located 8 miles (13 km) northwest of Arras on the D58 road. Carency is also the name of the brook which constitutes the course upstream of the Deûle river and which flows through the village.

Population

Places of interest
 The church of St Aignan, rebuilt, along with most of the village, after the destruction of World War I.
 Vestiges of a 13th-century castle.

Notable people
François Faber, winner of the 1909 Tour de France, died here fighting in the Second Battle of Artois, on 9 May 1915, during World War I.

See also
Communes of the Pas-de-Calais department

References

External links

 Communaupole of Lens-Liévin website 

Communes of Pas-de-Calais
Artois